Sai Kung West Country Park is  a  country park on the Sai Kung Peninsula in northeast Hong Kong. 

Opened in 1978 the park's sights include:

 Wong Chuk Wan
 Tai Mong Tsai
 Pak Tam Chung
 Yung Shue O
 Lai Chi Chong
 Hoi Ha Marine Park

History
Sai Kung West Country Park was formally designated on 3 February 1978.

See also
 Sai Kung West Country Park (Wan Tsai Extension)

References
Sai Kung West

1978 establishments in Hong Kong
Country parks and special areas of Hong Kong
Sai Kung Peninsula
Tai Po District